Huize Padua is a hamlet in the Dutch province of North Brabant, in the municipality of Boekel. 

Populated places in North Brabant
Boekel